Liu Zhongyong (was a Chinese poet of the Tang Dynasty. One of his poems is included in the famous Three Hundred Tang Poems anthology.

Poetry
Out of thirteen surviving poems in the Collected Tang Poems, Liu Zhongyong had one poem collected in Three Hundred Tang Poems, which was translated by Witter Bynner as "A Trooper's Burden".

References

External links
 

Three Hundred Tang Poems poets
Year of death unknown
Year of birth unknown
People from Yuncheng
Poets from Shanxi